Dairy Farmers of Ontario (DFO), is the marketing organization and regulatory body representing over 4,000 dairy farmers in Ontario, Canada. DFO was formerly known as the Ontario Milk Marketing Board (OMMB), which was established as result of the 1965 Ontario Milk Act. On August 1, 1995 the Ontario Milk Marketing Board and the Ontario Cream Producers' Marketing Board merged to form Dairy Farmers of Ontario.

Administration

The DFO management includes Murray Sherk as chair, Nick Thurler as vice-chair, Steve Runnals as 2nd vice-chair and Patrice Dubé as economics director.

History
The Dairy Farmers of Ontario was established in 1965 as regulatory organization, which derives its authority from the 1965 Ontario Milk Act. The Milk Act was passed in response to milk market inefficiencies and inequities in the 1960s. The Ontario provincial government 1963 commissioned study called for the creation of the Ontario Milk Marketing Board (OMMB) in Guelph, Ontario, an intermediate body to purchase all milk produced on Ontario farms and to sell it to milk processors. From the time of its inception in 1965 until 1995, Dairy Farmers of Ontario was known as Ontario Milk Marketing Board.

Mandate

DFO administers the raw cow milk quality program under the auspices of the Ontario Ministry of Agriculture, Food and Rural Affairs (OMAFRA), which licenses all dairy farms under the Ontario Milk Act. The Ontario Farm Products Marketing Commission delegates authority to all marketing boards, including the DFO. The DFO has the authority to set the price of milk, based on its end use. The DFO sets most prices based on those established at the national level by the Canadian Milk Supply Management Committee (CMSMC).

Supply management

In Canada, the dairy industry, along with the chicken, turkey, egg, and broiler hatching egg industries, operate under national supply management systems. In March 2018, the Wisconsin Farmers Union (WFU) hosted events in Eau Claire, Edgar, Fond du Lac, Dodgeville, and Westby featuring DFO's Ralph Dietrich and Murray Sherk talking  to Wisconsin dairy farmers about the benefits of Canada's dairy supply management to Canadian "producers, processors and the Canadian economy" In his message as DFO VC, Dietrich said that with American dairy system facing a crisis, the SM system provides an orderly marketing system as an option.

Dairy farming in Ontario

There are over four thousand dairy farmers in Ontario represented by the DFO as their marketing organization. Annually, Ontario dairy farms produce $1.8 billion worth of milk products making them the largest agricultural sector in the province. Dairy farmers in Ontario produce approximately 32 percent of Canada's milk.

Milk Producer

DFO publish the monthly dairy farmer's magazine, Milk Producer.

Spring Policy Conference (SPC)
The DFO holds a policy conference each spring. At the 2018 Spring Policy Conference (SPC), topics of discussion included the potential economic impact of international trade negotiations, both the Comprehensive and Progressive Agreement for Trans-Pacific Partnership (CPTPP), signed March 2018, and the North American Free Trade Agreement (NAFTA) under renegotiation. Other concerns included 2018 "milk production exceeding current demand" and changes in Health Canada's policies regarding the food guide and its labeling standards.

See also
Reference re Agricultural Products Marketing
Dairy farming in Canada
Milk quota
Canadian Dairy Commission

References

External 

 Dairy Farmers of Ontario fonds, Archives of Ontario

Marketing boards
Dairy organizations
Dairy farming in Canada
Agricultural organizations based in Canada